East Chelborough is a small village and civil parish  north-east of Beaminster in Dorset, England. Dorset County Council estimated in 2013 that the population of the parish was 50.

On the top of the ridge at the nearby Castle Hill are the earthwork remains of a motte-and-bailey castle.

References

External links

Villages in Dorset